Arachidonate 5-lipoxygenase-activating protein also known as 5-lipoxygenase activating protein, or FLAP, is a protein that in humans is encoded by the ALOX5AP gene.

Function 

FLAP is necessary for the activation of 5-lipoxygenase and therefore for the production of leukotrienes, 5-hydroxyeicosatetraenoic acid, 5-oxo-eicosatetraenoic acid, and specialized pro-resolving mediators of the lipoxin and resolvin classes. It is an integral protein within the nuclear membrane.  FLAP is necessary in synthesis of leukotriene, which are lipid mediators of inflammation that is involved in respiratory and cardiovascular diseases. FLAP functions as a membrane anchor for 5-lipooxygenase and as an amine acid-bind protein. How FLAP activates 5-lipooxygenase is not completely understood, but there is a physical interaction between the two.  FLAP structure consist of 4 transmembrane alpha helices, but they are found in 3's( trimer) forming a barrel. The barrel is about 60 A high and 36 A wide.

Clinical significance 

Leukotrienes, which require the FLAP protein to be synthesized, have an established pathological role in allergic and respiratory diseases. Animal and human genetic evidence suggests they may also have an important role in atherosclerosis, myocardial infarction, and stroke. The structure of FLAP provides a tool for the development of novel therapies for respiratory and cardiovascular diseases and for the design of focused experiments to probe the cell biology of FLAP and its role in leukotriene biosynthesis.

Inhibitors 
 AM-679
 MK-886
 Veliflapon (BAY X1005)

References

Further reading

External links 
 
 

Peripheral membrane proteins
Human proteins
Eicosanoids